Sonya Dangalakova (born 1 October 1962) is a Bulgarian swimmer. She competed in four events at the 1980 Summer Olympics.

References

1962 births
Living people
Bulgarian female swimmers
Olympic swimmers of Bulgaria
Swimmers at the 1980 Summer Olympics
People from Velingrad